Radoslav Látal (born 6 January 1970) is a Czech football coach and former player who played as a midfielder. Látal is currently in charge of I liga side Bruk-Bet Termalica Nieciecza.

Club career
At a club level, Látal began to play football in SK Sigma Olomouc, where he also played most of his Czech First League career. In 1994, he moved to Germany to play for FC Schalke 04, where he stayed until 2001. In 2002, Látal moved to FC Baník Ostrava and was a member of the squad in the 2003–04 season, when Baník won the league title. He also won the Czech Cup with Baník in 2005. After that season, he ended his professional career.

International career
He played for the Czech Republic, for which he appeared in 47 matches and participated at the Euro 1996 and Euro 2000. On 11 June 2000, he was dismissed by referee Pierluigi Collina in the closing moments of the Czechs' Euro 2000 game against the Netherlands. Látal, who had already been substituted in that match, was punished for what were perceived to be inappropriate words, following Collina's decision to award the Dutch a last-minute penalty.

Látal also played for Czechoslovakia at the 1989 FIFA World Youth Championship in Saudi Arabia.

Managerial career
He became manager of SFC Opava in 2008 and went on to Sokolov in September 2010. In March 2012 he signed a contract at Baník Ostrava lasting until summer 2013, taking over from Pavel Malura. He was fired from FC Baník Ostrava in October 2012 due to a run of bad results that put his team in the last place of Czech First League.

On 10 January 2022, it was confirmed that Látal would take over from Michał Probierz at the Bruk-Bet Termalica Sports Stadium. Látal's first competitive game in charge of Nieciecza ended in a 2–1 home victory against Jagiellonia Białystok on 4 February 2022.

Honours

Club 
Schalke 04
 UEFA Europa League: 1996–97

Baník Ostrava
 Czech First League: 2003–04
 Czech Cup: 2004–05

Dukla Prague
 Czechoslovak Cup: 1989–90

International 
Czech Republic
 UEFA European Football Championship runners-up: 1996

Individual 
 UEFA Team of the Tournament: UEFA Euro 1996
 Czech First League Best eleven of the season: 2003–04
 10th best Czech footballer of the decade (1993–03) by the fans poll
 In 2010 he was chosen as a member of All stars team SK Sigma Olomouc of all time by the club fans.

Manager 
MFK Košice
 Slovak Cup:  2014

Piast Gliwice
 Ekstraklasa runners-up: 2015–16

Dynamo Brest
 Belarusian Supercup:  2018

References

External links
 

1970 births
Living people
Sportspeople from Olomouc
Sportspeople from Prostějov
Czechoslovak footballers
Czech footballers
Association football midfielders
Czechoslovakia international footballers
Czech Republic international footballers
Dual internationalists (football)
UEFA Euro 1996 players
UEFA Euro 2000 players
UEFA Cup winning players
Czech First League players
Bundesliga players
Czech expatriate footballers
Expatriate footballers in Germany
SK Sigma Olomouc players
Dukla Prague footballers
FC Schalke 04 players
FC Baník Ostrava players
Czech football managers
Czech First League managers
Ekstraklasa managers
Czech expatriate football managers
Expatriate football managers in Belarus
Expatriate football managers in Slovakia
Expatriate football managers in Poland
FK Frýdek-Místek managers
SFC Opava managers
FK Baník Sokolov managers
FC Baník Ostrava managers
FC VSS Košice managers
Piast Gliwice managers
FC Dynamo Brest managers
FC Spartak Trnava managers
SK Sigma Olomouc managers
Bruk-Bet Termalica Nieciecza managers